Bədişqala (also, Bedishkala) is a village and municipality in the Qusar Rayon of Azerbaijan.  It has a population of 1,035.

References

External links

Populated places in Qusar District